Henriette Geertruida (Jet) Veth (Dordrecht, 7 August 1887 – Enschede, 18 April 1972) was a Dutch lawyer who, during her life, focused on the position of the child in Dutch law. She argued for separate children's judges since 1914 and for the removal of children under 14 from criminal law. In 1946, Veth was named a Knight in the Order of Orange-Nassau and in 1955 she was promoted to officer of that order.

References

1887 births
1972 deaths
Dutch women lawyers
20th-century Dutch lawyers
Recipients of the Order of Orange-Nassau
20th-century women lawyers
20th-century Dutch women